Macario Hing-Glover (born April 4, 1995) is an American soccer player who plays for Veikkausliiga club SJK as a right back.

Club career
Hing-Glover played for NK Istra 1961 in Croatian First Football League.

He signed for NK Krško in February 2018, eventually leaving the club in December 2018.

Honours 
Spartak Trnava
 Slovak Cup: 2018–19

Individual
Veikkausliiga Team of the Year: 2021

References

External links
 

1995 births
Living people
Soccer players from Phoenix, Arizona
American soccer players
American expatriate soccer players
Association football fullbacks
Duke Blue Devils men's soccer players
Burlingame Dragons FC players
NK Istra 1961 players
NK Krško players
FC Spartak Trnava players
HIFK Fotboll players
USL League Two players
Slovenian PrvaLiga players
Slovak Super Liga players
Veikkausliiga players
Expatriate footballers in Croatia
Expatriate footballers in Slovenia
Expatriate footballers in Slovakia
Expatriate footballers in Finland
American expatriate sportspeople in Croatia
American expatriate sportspeople in Slovenia
American expatriate sportspeople in Slovakia
American expatriate sportspeople in Finland